Jean Kienlen (21 October 1897 – 19 August 1954) was a French racing cyclist. He first rode in the 1921 Tour de France, where he finished in 31st place. He rode again in 1922, 1923 and 1929.

References

1897 births
1954 deaths
French male cyclists
Place of birth missing